Frank Burke may refer to:

Frank Burke (United States Army officer) (1918–1988), American army officer and Medal of Honor recipient
Frank G. Burke (1927–2015), acting archivist of the United States
Frank W. Burke (1920–2007), American politician
Frank Burke (Australian politician) (1876–1949), speaker of the New South Wales Legislative Assembly
Frank Burke (baseball) (1880–1946), American baseball player
Frank Burke (hurler) (born 1952), Irish hurler
Frank Burke (dual player) (1895–1987), Irish hurler and Gaelic footballer
Frankie Burke (1915–1983), American actor

See also
Francis Burke (disambiguation)